Isolation is a documentary film by Luke Seomore and Joseph Bull completed in 2009.

Summary 
The atmospheric documentary centers around the life of Stuart Griffiths, an ex-Paratrooper, who has since become a renowned social photographer. He journeys through England encountering ex-soldiers, experiencing the physical and emotional scars of life after the Army.

The film premiered at the Edinburgh film festival in June 2009.

References

External links 

Documentary films about homelessness
British documentary films
2009 films
Documentary films about mental health
Documentary films about veterans
Documentary films about photographers
2009 documentary films
2000s British films